Krông Nô is a rural district of Đắk Nông province in the Central Highlands region of Vietnam. As of 2003 the district had a population of 53,709. The district covers an area of 817 km². The district capital lies at Đắk Mâm.

References

Districts of Đắk Nông province